Machimoodus State Park is a public recreation area located on the Salmon River near the village of Moodus in the town of East Haddam, Connecticut. The state park is bordered by Sunrise State Park to the north and by the Salmon River and Salmon Cove to the west and south. The park is managed by the Connecticut Department of Energy and Environmental Protection.

History
The name Machimoodus derives from Native Americans who referred to the area as "the place of bad noises," the noises having been identified by modern science as the echoes of microearthquakes. The park was created when the Echo Farm dairy farm was purchased by the state for $2.1 million in 1998. It lies adjacent to Sunrise State Park, a defunct summer resort that was purchased by the state in 2008.

Activities and amenities
The park offers hiking, fishing, picnicking, and horseback riding. Lookout points on Mount Tom offer views of the Salmon, Moodus, and Connecticut rivers.

References

External links

Machimoodus State Park Connecticut Department of Energy and Environmental Protection
Machimoodus State Park Map Connecticut Department of Energy and Environmental Protection

State parks of Connecticut
Parks in Middlesex County, Connecticut
Protected areas established in 1998
1998 establishments in Connecticut
East Haddam, Connecticut